Solgi Rural District is a rural district (dehestan) in Khezel District, Nahavand County, Hamadan Province, Iran. As of the 2006 census, its population was 13,923, with 3,393 families. The rural district has 22 villages.

References 

Rural Districts of Hamadan Province
Nahavand County